The Battle of Tighina, also known as the Battle of Bender or the Battle of Bendery, was fought between 19 and 21 June 1992 between Moldova, backed by volunteers, military advisors and bought weapons from Romania; and the Pridnestrovian Moldavian Republic (PMR, commonly known as Transnistria), an unrecognized breakaway state that declared independence from Moldova and relied on direct military support from Russia. The battle occurred in Tighina, now better known as Bender, a mostly ethnic Russian city at the western bank of the Dniester River. This is different from the rest of currently Transnistrian-controlled lands, which are located at the eastern bank of it. Bender is the Russian name of the city and Tighina is the Romanian one.

Tighina was one of the points of greatest fighting during the whole Transnistria War together with Dubăsari, and the battle that occurred in the city was the bloodiest and biggest single incident in the conflict. Transnistria throughout the war had help from Russian regular troops and from the 14th Guards Army, which provided the Armed Forces of Transnistria with weapons and ammunition, this being vital to the separatist victory in Tighina. As a response to the presence of Russian troops in Moldovan territory, the President of Moldova Mircea Snegur requested retaliation against Russia from the United Nations (UN), receiving weak international support. Thus, on 21 July 1992, Moldova and Russia signed a ceasefire agreement that ended the Transnistria War. As a result of it, a so-called peacekeeping Russian military mission was installed in Transnistria and the latter started drifting apart from Moldovan institutions, becoming more independent from it.

In Transnistria, the Battle of Tighina was referred to as the "Stalingrad of today" by Transnistrian media at the time and was often compared to the Eastern Front of World War II, in which Nazi Germany invaded the Soviet Union (USSR). Russia was and is seen today as a "savior", while the Moldovan and Romanian forces were and are seen as "nationalists" and "fascists". On the other hand, in Moldova, the Battle of Tighina is nowadays seen as a provocation by "criminal" and "paramilitary" separatists made in order to disrupt the peace negotiation process of the conflict.

See also
 Transnistria conflict

References

Transnistria War
Tighina
1992 in Moldova
1992 in Transnistria
June 1992 events
Bender, Moldova
Tighina